Srđan Pavlov or Srdjan Pavlov, (born 28 January 1984) is a Serbian professional footballer. In 2012, he was traded to the Austrian Football Bundesliga team SK Sturm Graz. Later that year he moved to Blau-Weiß Linz; that contract was terminated in November. He plays as a striker.

References

External links
Srđan Pavlov at ÖFB

1984 births
Living people
Serbian footballers
Serbian expatriate footballers
Association football forwards
FK Rudar Kostolac players
Kapfenberger SV players
DSV Leoben players
FC Blau-Weiß Linz players
SK Sturm Graz players
FK Sloga Petrovac na Mlavi players
FC Mauerwerk players
Serbian expatriate sportspeople in Austria
Expatriate footballers in Austria